The Sud-Ouest Corse was a French mail and passenger transport aircraft, built by SNCASO.

Development and design
The Corse began as the S.O.90 Cassiopée, a nine-passenger aircraft. The S.O.93 Corse and S.O.94 Corse II prototypes were developed as the S.O.95 Corse III. The aircraft was a cantilever mid-wing monoplane, powered by two Renault 12S engines with a retractable conventional landing gear. Seating up to 13 passengers, the seats could be quickly removed in order to carry more cargo. Intended to serve Air France, it failed their aircraft requirements. 60 aircraft were built for Aeronavale, and a small number for other overseas airlines.

Variants
SNCASO SO.90 Cassiopée Wartime prototype for 8 passengers and powered by 325 hp Bearn 6D-07 engines.  First flew 16 August 1943 with 3 built.
S.O.93 Corse Prototype powered by Renault 12S engines, 1 built.
S.O.94 Corse II Production 10 passenger version, 15 built.
S.O.94R Radar training conversion of S.O.94.
S.O.95M Corse III Production 13 passenger version with tail-wheel undercarriage, all 45 built for military use.

Operators

French Air Force
French Navy

Air Services of India - ordered two aircraft in 1949. Withdrawn from service in October 1950.

Specifications (S.O.95 Corse III)

References

1940s French airliners
Corse II
Mid-wing aircraft
Aircraft first flown in 1947
Twin piston-engined tractor aircraft